In civil law, a collegatary is a person to whom is left a legacy, as imparted by a will, in common with one or more other individuals; so called as being a joint legatary, or co-legatee.

See also
Barratry
Condonation
Allonge

References

"Collegatary". Oxford English Dictionary. Oxford University Press. 2nd ed. 1989.

Civil law (common law)